Worden is a census-designated place (CDP) in Yellowstone County, Montana, United States. The population was 506 at the 2000 census. Worden, along with Ballantine, Huntley, and Pompey's Pillar, is part of the Huntley Project, an irrigation district established by the United States Bureau of Reclamation in 1907.

Worden is home to a number of restaurants, bars, stores, churches, and other services. It is also the home of the Huntley Project School System, consisting of an elementary, junior high, and high school. Huntley Project High School's team name is the "Red Devils."

History

Worden is located on land designated in 1868 as part of the Crow Indian Reservation. When the Northern Pacific Railroad was surveyed and built in the early 1880s, a station called "Clermont" was supposedly built 21 miles from Billings, just across the tracks from present-day Worden.

The town of Worden was mapped out in 1907 as part of the Huntley Project. Irrigation transformed the area into an agricultural district and attracted immigrants. The town had a German Congregational church and a Methodist church. A newspaper, The Yellowstone County News, was based here.

Geography
Worden is located at  (45.960697, -108.163568).

Worden is located along U.S. Route 312.

Demographics

As of the census of 2000, there were 506 people, 223 households, and 136 families residing in the CDP. The population density was 254.1 people per square mile (98.2/km). There were 239 housing units at an average density of 120.0 per square mile (46.4/km). The racial makeup of the CDP was 96.25% White, 0.59% African American, 0.99% Native American, 0.20% Asian, 0.40% from other races, and 1.58% from two or more races. Hispanic or Latino of any race were 3.56% of the population.

There were 223 households, out of which 27.8% had children under the age of 18 living with them, 46.6% were married couples living together, 11.2% had a female householder with no husband present, and 39.0% were non-families. 35.4% of all households were made up of individuals, and 17.5% had someone living alone who was 65 years of age or older. The average household size was 2.27 and the average family size was 2.97.

In the CDP, the population was spread out, with 25.5% under the age of 18, 8.1% from 18 to 24, 25.7% from 25 to 44, 23.7% from 45 to 64, and 17.0% who were 65 years of age or older. The median age was 40 years. For every 100 females, there were 96.1 males. For every 100 females age 18 and over, there were 89.4 males.

The median income for a household in the CDP was $22,625, and the median income for a family was $38,393. Males had a median income of $22,434 versus $20,156 for females. The per capita income for the CDP was $14,319. About 3.8% of families and 8.5% of the population were below the poverty line, including 8.9% of those under age 18 and 16.5% of those age 65 or over.

References

External links
 Bureau of Reclamation - Huntley Project
 Huntley Project Museum of Irrigated Agriculture
 Yellowstone County Towns, Train Stations & Post Offices, rootsweb.com

Census-designated places in Yellowstone County, Montana
Census-designated places in Montana
Billings metropolitan area